Curvisignella is a genus of moths in the family Gelechiidae. It contains the species Curvisignella leucogaea, which is found in Zimbabwe.

The wingspan is about 13 mm. The forewings are light grey overlaid with white. The hindwings are light grey.

References

Endemic fauna of Zimbabwe
Apatetrinae
Taxa named by Edward Meyrick
Moth genera